Vigne is a surname. Notable people with the surname include:

Chubb Vigne (1868–1955), South African rugby union player
Éric Vigne, French writer
Gilles Vigne (born 1950), French swimmer
Godfrey Vigne (1801–1863), English cricketer and traveller
Henry Vigne (1817–1898), English cricketer
Blessed Pierre Vigne (1670–1740), French Roman Catholic priest
Randolph Vigne (1928–2016), South African anti-apartheid activist and member of the Liberal Party of South Africa
Thomas Vigne (1771–1841), English cricketer

See also
Vigne Glacier, a glacier in Pakistan